Muhammad Rashid Shah is a Pakistani politician who had been a Member of the Provincial Assembly of Sindh, from May 2013 to May 2018.

Early life 

He was born on 27 February 1979 in Kingri.

Political career

He was elected to the Provincial Assembly of Sindh as a candidate of Pakistan Muslim League (F) from Constituency PS-30 KHAIRPUR-II in 2013 Pakistani general election.

He was re-elected to Provincial Assembly of Sindh as a candidate of Grand Democratic Alliance (GDA) from Constituency PS-32 (Khairpur-VII) in 2018 Pakistani general election.

References

Living people
Sindh MPAs 2013–2018
1979 births
Pakistan Muslim League (F) politicians
Grand Democratic Alliance MPAs (Sindh)
Sindh MPAs 2018–2023